Paris, Texas is a city in the northeast portion of the U.S. state of Texas.

Paris, Texas may also refer to: 

Paris, Texas (film), a 1984 film directed by Wim Wenders
 Paris, Texas, a soundtrack by Ry Cooder
Paris, Texas (band), a punk rock band from the U.S. state of Wisconsin
 Paris Texas (musical duo), an alternative hip hop duo from Compton, California
 Paris, Texas, a song by Lana Del Rey from the upcoming album Did You Know That There's a Tunnel Under Ocean Blvd

See also
Parris, Texas
Paris (disambiguation)